Blue Blaze is a Marvel comics character.

Blue Blaze may also refer to:

 Blue Blazes, a 1936 American short comedy film starring Buster Keaton
 Blue Blazes (film), a 1926 American Western film starring Pete Morrison
 Blue Blazes (manga) (Aoi Honō), a Japanese manga series by Kazuhiko Shimamoto

See also
 'Blue Blazes' Rawden, a 1918 American silent drama film
 Blue blazer (disambiguation)